International Superstar Soccer (abbreviated as ISS, known as Jikkyou World Soccer 2000, Jikkyou World Soccer 2000 Final Edition and Jikkyou J-League Perfect Striker 3 in Japan) is a football video game in the International Superstar Soccer series by Konami. International Superstar Soccer is a game for one or two players, or even up to four players with the PlayStation's multitap.

Players can train and edit their teams, and they can change the formations and tactics before the match. During the match, they can adjust camera angles, make substitutions and tactical changes, adjust the game speed, and so on. The main game element is controlling the players, making searching passes, and scoring goals.

ISS 2000 was the first installment in the series to feature fully licensed teams. All teams that competed in the UEFA Euro 2000 tournament, alongside many others, have real players and likeness. Additionally, most international teams have their real kit.

Teams

Teams marked in bold are fully licensed.

Europe 1

Europe 2

Europe 3

Europe 4

Europe 5

Europe 6

Africa 1

North America

South America

Asia 1

Asia 2

Oceania

U-23 Teams
England
Portugal
Spain
France
Netherlands
Belgium
Denmark
Germany
Switzerland
Italy
Poland
Czech Republic
Slovakia	
Croatia	
Yugoslavia
Greece
Sweden
Norway
Russia
Turkey
Tunisia
Morocco
Nigeria
Cameroon
South Africa
USA
Mexico
Jamaica
Honduras
Colombia
Peru
Brazil
Bolivia
Paraguay
Uruguay
Chile
Argentina
Japan
South Korea
China
Hong Kong
Thailand
Malaysia
Nepal
Kazakhstan
Uzbekistan
Iran
UAE
Saudi Arabia
Australia

References

2000 video games
Konami games
Multiplayer and single-player video games
International Superstar Soccer
PlayStation (console) games
PlayStation 2 games
Game Boy Advance games
Video games developed in Japan